Ertem is both a Turkish surname and a given name. Notable people with the name include:

Ceylan Ertem (born 1980), Turkish singer-songwriter
Ertem Eğilmez (1929–1989), Turkish film director, producer, and screenwriter

Turkish-language surnames
Turkish given names